The Bahia antwren (Herpsilochmus pileatus) or pileated antwren is a species of bird in the family Thamnophilidae. It is endemic to Brazil.

Its natural habitats are subtropical or tropical dry forest, subtropical or tropical moist lowland forest, and subtropical or tropical moist shrubland.
It is threatened by habitat loss.

References

External links
BirdLife Species Factsheet.

Bahia antwren
Birds of the Atlantic Forest
Endemic birds of Brazil
Bahia antwren
Taxonomy articles created by Polbot